Club Olympique de Roubaix-Tourcoing was a football club based in Roubaix, France. The team was founded in 1945 in a merge of three clubs: Excelsior AC Roubaix, RC Roubaix and US Tourcoing. In the 1946–47 season, the club won the Division 1. The club later fell into the lower levels of French football and was eventually dissolved on 15 June 1970.

Honours
 Division 1: 1946–47

Managerial history

References

External links
 Fan site
 History

 
Association football clubs established in 1945
Association football clubs disestablished in 1970
1945 establishments in France
1970 disestablishments in France
CO Roubaix-Tourcoing
Roubaix-Tourcoing
Football clubs in Hauts-de-France
Ligue 1 clubs